Kelley Abbey (born 28 July 1966) is an Australian actress, choreographer, singer and dancer. She has been a leading performer and choreographer in TV, film and musical theatre for more than 20 years. She remains best known for her role on soap opera E Street as Jo-Jo Adams.

Abbey played Sheila in the 2003 Australian cast of Hair and Rizzo in an arena production of Grease, and later choreographed an arena stadium tour of Grease – the Arena Spectacular. Other musicals Abbey has choreographed include Follies at the Sydney Opera House, Footloose and most recently Hugh Jackman's The Boy from Oz in the Arena for which she won a Helpmann Award along with Kenny Ortega.

Abbey has also choreographed Xanadu the musical, Funny Girl starring Caroline O'Connor, Jesus Christ Superstar, Miracle City and Cabaret the Musical. She has choreographed Gail Edwards Carmen on the harbour for Opera Australia and also Gail's Helpmann award-winning version of Salome and a different version of Carmen for John Bell on the Opera House main stage. In 2010 she directed and choreographed a new rebooted version of Fame the Musical where she won another Helpmann Award. She was also the associate director to Baz Luhrmann on Strictly Ballroom the musical. She continues to mentor young performers around the country about mindset and nurturing your creativity whilst pursuing a career in the Entertainment Industry.

Choreography
Abbey was honoured at the Choreography Media Honours in Los Angeles for her choreography in the Oscar-winning feature Happy Feet. She was also head motion capture consultant on the film, ran "penguin school" and was the principal motion capture performer.

Abbey has also choreographed many music videos, pop concert tours, television commercials and awards specials. She appeared in the film In Her Skin starring Guy Pearce and Sam Neill which she choreographed and also plays a small role.

Abbey appears as a special guest judge and choreographer on the hit TV show So You Think You Can Dance and choreographs for the So You Think You Can Dance franchise internationally. She also was chosen to represent Australia on the reality television show Superstars of Dance on the NBC Network. As of the sixteenth season, she has also been the creative director and choreographer for Dancing with the Stars Australia.

Patronage 
Abbey is the Patron of the Brisbane Performing Arts Challenge. She is the Ambassador of Dancelife Unite and also The Australian Dance Festival.

Awards 
Abbey won the Green Room Award and Variety Heart awards for her performance as the lead in Sweet Charity. She also won a Mo Award for playing the lead in Fame the Musical which she also choreographed. She won the Green Room Award for her choreography in Fame and later restaged this show in Asia and South Africa.

Mo Awards
The Australian Entertainment Mo Awards (commonly known informally as the Mo Awards), were annual Australian entertainment industry awards. They recognise achievements in live entertainment in Australia from 1975 to 2016. Kelley Abbey won two awards in that time.
 (wins only)
|-
| 1997
| Kelley Abbey
| Female Musical Theatre Performer of the Year
| 
|-
| 1999
| Kelley Abbey
| Female Dance Performer/ Choreographer of the Year
| 
|-

References

External links 

 
 
 Dancelife
 Dance Train

Australian choreographers
Australian film actresses
Australian television actresses
Australian stage actresses
Helpmann Award winners
Living people
1966 births
People from Brisbane